Albano Mucci (born 30 December 1968), known as Al Mucci and Wildlife Al. Albano is a champion for environmental management and animal conservation and social justice for Australia's Indigenous Peoples.

Early life 
Mucci was born in Auburn, New South Wales, Australia to Australian immigrants (mother Maria Mucci (née Radovnicovich), father Albano Mucci).

Contributions to science

Scientific Papers 
The following are scientific papers that Albano Mucci has contributed to and that have been published:

 Plasma prolactin concentrations during lactation, pouch young development and the return to behavioural oestrus in captive koalas (Phascolarctos cinereus)
 The use of a progestin, levonorgestrel, to control the oestrous cycle in the koala
 Use of the gonadotrophin-releasing hormone antagonist azaline B to control the oestrous cycle in the koala (Phascolarctos cinereus)

References

Australian environmentalists
1968 births
Living people